As a nickname, Gonzo may refer to:

 Braulio Arellano Domínguez, Mexican drug lord known as "El Gonzo"
 Adrián González (born 1982), American Major League Baseball player
 Alex Gonzalez, American former Major League Baseball player
 Fernando González (born 1980), Chilean tennis player
 Jean-Michel Gonzalez (born 1967), French former rugby union footballer and current coach
 Luis Gonzalez (born 1967), American former Major League Baseball player
 Tony Gonzalez (born 1976), National Football League tight end
 Georgi Ivanov, Bulgarian former footballer
 Stewart MacLaren (born 1953), Scottish former footballer
 Gary Pratt (born 1981), English cricketer and footballer

See also 

Lists of people by nickname